= Maryam Nnafatima Imam =

Nigerian politician

Commissioner for Social Development
- Governor: AbdulRahman AbdulRazaq

Personal details
- Party: All Progressives Congress
- Occupation: Politician

Maryam Nnafatima Imam is a Nigerian politician and public administrator serving as Commissioner for Social Development in Kwara State. She previously served as Senior Special Assistant on Sustainable Development Goals (SDGs) in the state government.

== Early life and education ==
Maryam Nnafatima Imam is from Tsaragi Ward III in Edu Local Government Area of Kwara State. She holds a Ph.D. and has an academic background that supports her work in governance and development policy.

== Political career ==
She served as Senior Special Assistant on Sustainable Development Goals (SDGs) to the Kwara State Government, where she coordinated development-related programs and SDG implementation strategies. She also participated in organizing SDG-focused events such as state conventions.

In 2025, she was nominated by Governor AbdulRahman AbdulRazaq as Commissioner in Kwara State and later confirmed by the State House of Assembly after screening. She was subsequently sworn in as Commissioner for Social Development

As Commissioner for Social Development, she oversees policies targeting vulnerable groups, including women, children, and elderly citizens. Her ministry also supports social welfare programs and community development initiatives in Kwara State.
